Ellen Jones may refer to:

 Ellen Jones (novelist), American author of historical romance novels, published from 1991
 Ellen Isabel Jones (died 1946), née Cotton, English suffragette and close associate of the Pankhursts
 Ellen Jaffe Jones, American consumer, health, and fitness journalist and author
 Ellen Jones (translator), British scholar and translator
 Ellen Jones (footballer) (born 2002), English footballer
 Elin Jones (born 1966), member of the National Assembly for Wales

See also
Mary Ellen Jones (disambiguation)
Helen Jones (disambiguation)